Marc Kaminsky is a poet, writer, psychotherapist, and gerontologist whose work ranges from editing a study of life review called The Uses of Reminiscence to poetry like A Table With People and The Road from Hiroshima. He organized and conducted among the earliest writing and reminiscing groups for elders. He also did work on the culture of Yiddishkeit. He edited the work of Barbara Myerhoff in Stories As Equipment for Living. His long poem, The Road from Hiroshima, was produced as a play for voices for National Public Radio and was the inspiration for other works including a musical requiem. His most recent book is Shadow Traffic, a collection of essays, poems and short stories that deals with the aftermath of the Holocaust as well as the aftermath of personal traumas.

Biography
Born in 1943 in New York City, Kaminsky studied at Columbia University where graduated with a B.A. in 1964, and an M.A. in 1967. He was the director for the West Side Senior Center at the Jewish Association for Services for the Aged (JASA) from 1972 to 1977.

Published works
Birthday Poems (Horizon Press, 1972)
What's Inside You It Shines Out of You (Horizon Press, 1974)
A New House (Horizon Press, 1974)
The Journal Project (Teachers & Writers Collaborative, 1980)
A Table With People (Sun, 1982)
Daily Bread (University of Illinois Press, 1982)
The Road from Hiroshima (Simon & Schuster, 1984)
The Uses of Reminiscence (Haworth Press, 1984)
Target Populations (Central Park Editions, 1991)
Shadow Traffic (Red Hen Press, 2007)

References

1943 births
Living people
American male poets
American gerontologists